Television in South Sudan has a low penetration of around 15% to 20%, as many households cannot afford the cost of a satellite dish, and terrestrial television is the dominant platform. Radio became the main source of news and information in South Sudan.

List of channels

List of defunct channels
In 2013, the owners of The Citizen daily newspaper launched The Citizen Television (CTV) station broadcasting from the capital, Juba, for five hours each evening. However, in September 2015 the Editor-in-Chief of The Citizen Nhial Bol announced he was resigning and shutting down the newspaper and TV station after government security agents shut down his newspaper's premises, while receiving death threats.

See also
 Media of South Sudan

References

 
Television stations in South Sudan